Kavango West is one of the fourteen regions of Namibia. Its capital and only self-governed settlement is Nkurenkuru, its governor is Sirkka Ausiku. The Region was created in 2013 when the Kavango Region was split into Kavango East and Kavango West. In the north, Kavango West borders the Cuando Cubango Province of Angola. Domestically, it borders the following regions:
Kavango East – east
Otjozondjupa – south
Oshikoto – west
Ohangwena – northwest

Because of its rather high rainfall compared to most other parts of Namibia and its location on the Kavango River after which it was named, this region has agricultural potential for the cultivation of a variety of crops, as well as for organised forestry and agro-forestry, which stimulates furniture making and related industries. Kavango West and its sister region Kavango East are nevertheless the poorest regions in Namibia.

Politics
The Fourth Delimitation Commission of Namibia, responsible for recommending on the country's administrative divisions suggested in August 2013 to split the Kavango Region into two. The president Hifikepunye Pohamba enacted the recommendations. As a result, the new Regions of Kavango East and Kavango West have been created. As of 2020, Kavango West had 23,804 registered voters.

Administrative division
The region is subdivided into eight electoral constituencies:
 Kapako
 Mankumpi
 Mpungu
 Musese
 Ncamangoro
 Ncuncuni
 Nkurenkuru
 Tondoro

In the 2015 regional elections SWAPO won in all eight constituencies. SWAPO also won all constituencies in the 2020 regional election, all of them by a landslide, and with overall more than 90% of the votes.

Governors

The first Governor of Kavango West was Samuel Mbambo, former Governor of Kavango Region and sitting Governor of Kavango East. On 27 April 2014 Sirkka Ausiku, formerly Permanent Secretary of the Ministry of Regional and Local Government, Housing and Rural Development, was appointed. He kept his position in 2015 in president Hage Geingob new government.

Population

The region is characterised by an extremely uneven population distribution. The interior is very sparsely inhabited, while the northernmost strip, especially along the Kavango River, has a high population concentration.

References

External links

 
Regions of Namibia
States and territories established in 2013
2013 establishments in Namibia